Katie Emily Douglas (born October 19, 1998) is a Canadian actress. She has played roles in Spooksville (2013–2014), Mary Kills People (2017–2019), had lead roles in Believe Me: The Abduction of Lisa McVey, Level 16 (both 2018), and The Girl Who Escaped: The Kara Robinson Story (2023). She was Abigail (Abby) Littman in the Netflix series Ginny and Georgia (2021-) and Jackie in Pretty Hard Cases (2021-2022).

Early life and career
Douglas started acting at the age of six at the Great Big Theatre Company  in Burlington, Ontario. She starred in a number of productions including a Christmas play involving penguins and as Tinkerbell at the summer camp of the Burlington Dance Academy. Douglas attended Nelson High School in Burlington. Throughout her early acting career, Douglas completed her education having a travelling tutor.

Career
Douglas began her screen acting career at the age of six in F2: Forensic Factor. Douglas later played Sally Wilcox on Discovery Family’s fantasy action TV show Spooksville in 2013, but it only lasted one season. Douglas starred as Young Irisa on the science fiction action TV series Defiance: The Lost Ones which premiered on SyFy in March 2014. At the age of 15, Douglas was nominated for Outstanding Performer in a Children’s Series at the 41st Daytime Creative Arts Emmy Awards held in Los Angeles in 2014, for her role as Sally Wilcox in Spooksville.

Douglas starred as Naomi Malik from 2017 to 2019 in the Global Network Canadian comedy and drama TV series Mary Kills People. Douglas played a lead role as Vivien on the 2018 science fiction movie Level 16.

In 2019, Douglas received an ACTRA Award nomination for her performance in the lead role of Believe Me: The Abduction of Lisa McVey, eventually losing out to Amybeth McNulty. In 2021, she starred as Abby, a friend of Ginny and part of the MANG group (Max, Abby, Norah and Ginny) in the Netflix comedy series Ginny and Georgia. Douglas stars in a main role as 18-year-old Jackie Sullivan in the CBC Television female police comedy-drama television series Pretty Hard Cases from 2021 to 2022.

In 2022, Douglas stars as Kate Coughlin in the Daniel Adams directed police protection film The Walk in a cast which includes Justin Chatwin, Terrence Howard and Malcolm McDowell. In 2023, Katie Douglas joined The Wayne Ayers Podcast to talk aboutGinny and Georgia season 2, and starred as the protagonist Kara Robinson, in the television movie The Girl Who Escaped: The Kara Robinson Story.

Filmography

Film

Television film

Television series

Awards and nominations

References

External links
 
 Katie Douglas at the 41st Daytime Creative Arts Emmy Awards in 2014
 Double-Edged film trailer 2020

1998 births
21st-century Canadian actresses
Actresses from Ontario
Canadian film actresses
Canadian television actresses
Living people
People from Burlington, Ontario